Radical 23 or radical hiding  is one of the 23 Kangxi radicals (214 radicals total) composed of two strokes.

In the Kangxi Dictionary, there are 17 characters (out of 49,030) to be found under this radical.

In Traditional Chinese used in Taiwan, Hong Kong and Macau, radical 23 (hiding enclosure), whose second stroke starts is a bit right to the starting point of the first stroke, is slightly different from radical 22 (right open box).'

In mainland China, radical 22 and 23 were unified as right open box , and the nuance, as well as radical hiding enclosure, no longer exists in Simplified Chinese characters. This merger also applies to Traditional Chinese characters in China's GB character set.

A similar merger was also made in Japanese kanji, including their kyūjitai forms in JIS X 0208 character set. Some Japanese dictionaries keep the two radicals in their indexes, but they both lead to the same merged radical.

Evolution

Derived characters

Literature 

`

References

External links

Unihan Database - U+5338

023